Landeshauptstadt Kiel v Jaegar (2003) C-151/02 is a European labour law case concerning the EU Working Time Directive.

Facts
A doctor remained on call between shifts and was given a room to sleep in at the hospital. The collective agreement said the average time working when on call (periods between 16 and 25 hours) should not exceed 49% of the on call period. Dr Jaeger argued that all on call time should be regarded as working time. The Bundesarbeitsgericht asked for a preliminary ruling, asking whether under art 3 and art 6 of 93/104/EC time spent on call was working time (as implemented by the Law on Working Time 1994 §5 III in Germany). The law said Dr Jaeger had to stay at work, but could sleep there if not required to work. On average, Dr Jaeger did spend 49% of his time on call. The time spent inactive was deemed to be a rest period.

Judgment
The European Court of Justice held that all time he was required to be at the hospital, even when sleeping, was to be regarded as working time. The Directive, after the SIMAP case could not be taken to treat inactive on call time as a rest period. Dr Jaeger, by being required to stay at work was subject to greater constraints than a doctor at home, because he was kept apart from his family and social environment. The 1994 Act breached the Directive by letter Dr Jaeger’s collective agreement provide for offsetting of only active on call time. Under Art 17, a derogation to allow for a reduction of the daily minimum rest of 8 hours could only be granted if a period of rest followed immediately, and a reduction could not allow the maximum weekly working time to be exceeded.

Significance
Following the ECJ's decision, the European Commission in COM (2004) 607 final, proposed that time spent at work on call need not be classed as ‘working time’. The proposal has not been adopted. But in response member states by a dramatic degree increased the number of opt-outs for health work. 15 governments apply opt outs, mostly in respect of health care.

See also

Working Time Directive

Notes

German case law
Court of Justice of the European Union case law
2003 in case law
2003 in Germany
European Union labour case law